The 1961 season of the Paraguayan Primera División, the top category of Paraguayan football, was played by 11 teams. The national champions were Cerro Porteño.

Results

Championship Playoffs

10th/11th-place play-offs

Promotion/relegation play-offs

External links
Paraguay 1961 season at RSSSF

Para
Paraguayan Primera División seasons
Primera